Slavko Svinjarević (6 April 1935 – 2006) was a Yugoslav and Serbian footballer who played as a defender.

Career
Svinjarević played for Vojvodina between 1955 and 1965, making 165 appearances in the Yugoslav First League. He subsequently moved abroad to Germany and joined Wormatia Worms, spending the next four seasons at the club.

At international level, Svinjarević was capped six times for Yugoslavia. He represented his country at the 1962 FIFA World Cup.

References

External links
 
 
 

1962 FIFA World Cup players
2. Bundesliga players
Association football defenders
Expatriate footballers in Germany
FK Vojvodina players
People from Sremski Karlovci
Serbian footballers
Wormatia Worms players
Yugoslav expatriate footballers
Yugoslav expatriate sportspeople in Germany
Yugoslav First League players
Yugoslav footballers
Yugoslavia international footballers
1935 births
2006 deaths